"Ring My Bell" is a 1991 song recorded by British rapper Monie Love and American singer Adeva. Released as a single, it reached the top 10 in Finland and Switzerland, and the top 20 in the Netherlands and the UK.

Track listing

 7", UK (1991)
"Ring My Bell"
"Ring My Bell" (Upper Cut Mix)

 12", Europe (1991)
"Ring My Bell" (Touchdown Mix) — 5:47
"Ring My Bell" (Upper Cut Mix) — 4:32
"Ring My Bell" (L-Plate Mix) — 8:08

 CD single, Europe (1991)
"Ring My Bell"
"Ring My Bell" (Touchdown Mix)
"Ring My Bell" (Upper Cut Mix)

 CD maxi, Europe (1991)
"Ring My Bell"	3:35
"Ring My Bell" (Touchdown Mix) — 5:49
"Ring My Bell" (Upper Cut Mix) — 4:32

Charts

References

1991 singles
1991 songs
Chrysalis Records singles
Cooltempo Records singles
Hip house songs
House music songs
Monie Love songs